Electoral district of Darling Downs may refer to any of three former electorates based in the Darling Downs region of Queensland:

 Division of Darling Downs, a former electorate of the Australian House of Representatives
 Electoral district of Darling Downs (New South Wales), a former electorate of the New South Wales Legislative Assembly
 Electoral district of Darling Downs (Queensland), a former electorate of the Queensland Legislative Assembly